Ian Doyle Marshall (27 April 1942 – 22 April 2003) was a football (soccer) coach who managed the New Zealand national team. Marshall secured the job in June 1989 and took charge of his first official international in January 1990. New Zealand won 13, drew 3 and lost 19 of his 35 games in charge.

During his playing career, Marshall gained a runner-sup Chatham Cup medal for Christchurch Technical, playing in goal in the 1968 final.

References

External links

1942 births
2003 deaths
Scottish emigrants to New Zealand
New Zealand association football coaches
New Zealand national football team managers
Scottish expatriate football managers